Oree may refer to:

Places
 Orée-du-Parc District, Gatineau, Quebec, Canada
 Orée-d'Anjou, a commune in Maine-et-Loire, France
 L'Orée-d'Écouves, a commune in Orne, France
 L'Orée, a residential development in Lésigny, Seine-et-Marne, France
 Oree, a village in Imo State, Nigeria
 Oree, a village in Kwara State, Nigeria

Other uses
 O'Ree, a surname
 Royal Orée, a field hockey team that participated in the 2018–19 Men's Belgian Hockey League

People with the given name
 Oree Banks (born 1936), American football player and coach
 Oree Bozeman, namesake of Oree Bozman Intermediate School in the Conroe Independent School District
 Oree Walker (died 1991), mother of Cindy Walker

Fictional
 Oree Shoth, a character in The Broken Kingdoms

See also

 Charny-Orée-de-Puisaye, a commune in Yonne, France
 Communauté de communes de l'Orée de la Brie, a metropolitan community in Île-de-France, France
 École de l'Orée-des-Cantons, an elementary school in the Commission scolaire du Val-des-Cerfs
 Ree (disambiguation)